Joseph Crow may refer to:

Joseph Fire Crow (1959–2017), Cheyenne flutist
Joe Medicine Crow (1913–2016), Crow historian

See also
Joseph Crowe (disambiguation)